In seven-dimensional Euclidean geometry, the quarter 8-cubic honeycomb is a uniform space-filling tessellation (or honeycomb). It has half the vertices of the 8-demicubic honeycomb, and a quarter of the vertices of a 8-cube honeycomb. Its facets are 8-demicubes h{4,36}, pentic 8-cubes h6{4,36}, {3,3}×{32,1,1} and {31,1,1}×{31,1,1} duoprisms.

See also 
Regular and uniform honeycombs in 8-space:
8-cube honeycomb
8-demicube honeycomb
8-simplex honeycomb
Truncated 8-simplex honeycomb
Omnitruncated 8-simplex honeycomb

Notes

References 
 Kaleidoscopes: Selected Writings of H. S. M. Coxeter, edited by F. Arthur Sherk, Peter McMullen, Anthony C. Thompson, Asia Ivic Weiss, Wiley-Interscience Publication, 1995,  
 (Paper 24) H.S.M. Coxeter, Regular and Semi-Regular Polytopes III, [Math. Zeit. 200 (1988) 3-45] See p318 
 

Honeycombs (geometry)
9-polytopes